Dicronorhina micans  is a species of beetle of the family Scarabaeidae and subfamily Cetoniinae. It is native to the African tropics.

Description
Dicronorhina micans is the largest of its genus. Their basic color is metallic green with a golden or bluish shade. The males have a "T"-shaped, flat horn in the forehead.

The females lay their eggs in the substrate. After about two weeks the larvae appear, that need about five months to develop, while the development of the chrysalids takes about 2 months. As the adult beetles can live approximately three months, the full life cycle will take about ten months. These beetles are active in the daytime and feed on nectar and overripe fruit.

Distribution
These beetles are mainly present in the Democratic Republic of the Congo, Cameroon, and Uganda.

References
  Biolib
 Bugdesign

External links
  Photos of Dicronorhina micans
  Goliathus
  Beetlegate
  Dicronorhina micans

Cetoniinae
Beetles described in 1773
Taxa named by Dru Drury